Imp Mountain is a mountain located in Coos County, New Hampshire. The mountain is part of the Carter-Moriah Range of the White Mountains, which runs along the northern east side of Pinkham Notch.  Imp Mountain is flanked to the northeast by Mount Moriah, and to the southwest by North Carter Mountain.

See also

 List of mountains in New Hampshire
 White Mountain National Forest

References

Mountains of New Hampshire
Mountains of Coös County, New Hampshire